The 1931 Gonzaga Bulldogs football team was an American football team that represented Gonzaga University as an independent during the 1931 college football season. In their first year under head coach Mike Pecarovich, the Bulldogs compiled a 3–4 record and outscored opponents by a total of 116 to 59.

Schedule

References

Gonzaga
Gonzaga Bulldogs football seasons
Gonzaga Bulldogs football